Deirdre O'Donoghue (July 16, 1948–January 21, 2001) was a disc jockey known for her shows SNAP! on KCRW-FM and Breakfast with the Beatles on KMET-FM and later KLSX-FM. She has been called the "most influential American DJ you’ve never heard of" due to her show having many underground guests such as The Dream Syndicate and Concrete Blonde, while also welcoming established artists as well.

Biography  
She started her radio career in 1973, working at WBCN and WNTN in Boston, then moving to WABX in Detroit in 1975 then going to KMGC in Dallas. In 1979, she moved to Los Angeles, starting at KKGO-FM and meeting Harry Shearer before joining KCRW-FM in 1980. There, she started the program SNAP! (an acronym for Saturday Night Avant Pop), and later started the program Breakfast with the Beatles in 1976 at KMET-FM, simultaneously working at both stations to do both shows. SNAP! ran from the 1980s into the early 1990s alongside Breakfast with the Beales. KCRW aired three nights a week with things that were considered the "cutting edge of contemporary pop music." When KMET changed formats in 1987, O’Donoghue took Breakfast with the Beatles to KNX-FM.

Firings 
In 1986, she was briefly fired by the bosses at KCRW due in part to her refusal to share her playlists with the music department. On November 2, 1986, KCRW's Ruth Seymour fired O'Donoghue for not sticking to the music and talking about other things such as the Nicaraguan Revolution, which led to O'Donoghue's friend and colleage DJ Brent Wilcox resigning on air in protest. She returned in March 2, 1987, and remained with KCRW until 1991, when she left for health reasons.

Death and legacy 
O'Donoghue died unexpectedly on January 21, 2001, at her home in Santa Monica, leaving behind an archive of KCRW interviews and performances from the 1980s on her show. Foul play is not suspected by the coroners office. Many people expressed sadness because of her death, including musicians Henry Rollins and Michael Stipe, as well as people like Tom Schnabel.

In 2021, Tricia Halloran and Bob Carlson, both of whom were friends of O'Donoghue, announced a 10-part podcast series called Bent By Nature that used her unheard tapes, recorded by O'Donoghue herself.

References 

1948 births
2001 deaths
American women DJs